Tandinsky District (Tañdı kojuun) is an administrative and municipal district (raion, or kozhuun), one of the seventeen in the Tuva Republic, Russia. It is located in the center of the republic. Its administrative center is the rural locality (a selo) of Bay-Khaak. Population:  13,827 (2002 Census);  The population of Bay-Khaak accounts for 23.1% of the district's total population.

References

Notes

Sources

Districts of Tuva